Sergio García Gómez (born 9 October 1992) is a Spanish professional boxer who held the European super-welterweight title from 2018 to 2021.

Professional career

Early career
García began boxing professionally at the age of 19, defeating Celestino Chacon by knockout on his debut in Maliaño, Spain, on 26 May 2012. Having won his first eight fights, García signed a promotional deal with Maravillabox Promotions in September 2013. In his ninth fight, he secured his first professional boxing title when he won the vacant WBC Mundo Hispano super welterweight title courtesy of a late TKO stoppage of compatriot Raul Asencio in Castellón de la Plana on 25 October 2013. He picked up domestic honours, securing the vacant Spanish super welterweight title in Torrelavega on 29 November 2014. He won the title following a third round stoppage of Jose Manuel Lopez Clavero, taking his record to 16–0 in the process.

He fought Russian Pavel Mamontov for the WBC International super welterweight title in Torrelavega on 4 June 2016. García won the fight by unanimous decision, winning comfortably on the judges' scorecards. García made a further step up  when he defeated compatriot Isaac Real in Barcelona a year later, on 10 June 2017, in doing so he won the WBC Silver super welterweight title. García won the fight by unanimous decision. He successfully defended his WBC Silver title back in Torrelavega on 22 September 2017, his opponent Felipe Moncelli retired in the seventh round of the contest.

European super welterweight champion
García was scheduled to fight Zakaria Attou for the vacant European super welterweight title, but Attou was forced to withdraw due to a cut suffered in sparring. Attou was replaced at late notice by  Frenchman Maxime Beaussire. The fight took place in Torrelavega on 29 September 2018, García securing a comprehensive victory by unanimous decision, with the judges scoring the bout 120–108, 119–109 and 118–110 respectively.

He agreed a deal to defend his title against unbeaten British boxer Ted Cheeseman at The O2 Arena in London on 2 February 2019, the main event on the card. This meant that García would be fighting outside of his home country for the first time in his professional career. García stated that he hoped that defeating Cheeseman would open up opportunities to fight at world level. García secured a comprehensive unanimous decision victory over Cheeseman to retain his title, with two judges scoring the fight 119–109, whilst the other judge scored it 115–114. García retained his European title once again on 22 June 2019, defeating Sergey Rabchenko by unanimous decision in Torrelavega; the judges scorecards reading 119–109,119–110 and 117–111 in García's favour.

Professional boxing record

References

External links

1992 births
Living people
Spanish male boxers
People from Torrelavega
Light-middleweight boxers
20th-century Spanish people
21st-century Spanish people